The Gbaran tribe of the Ijaw people lives along Taylor Creek ("Gbarain toru") in central Bayelsa State, Nigeria. Gbaran settlements include: Okotiama, Poloaku, Obinagha, Ogboloma, Nedugo, Agbia, Ibiaye (Ebiyai), and  Koroama. Okotiama is the senior community. The close proximity of Gbaran villages along Taylor Creek has helped them maintain their shared cultural traditions. The clan god is Gbaran Ziba.

Gbarain is actually a clan occupying the villages mentioned above. The Gbarain people are part of the Izon (Ijaw) ethnic nationality. Gbarain was founded by a man called Gbarainowei, son of Oporoza the son of Izon. Gbarainowei's brothers are Kumbowei and Kabowei in Sagbama Local Government Area of Bayelsa State in Nigeria. The Gbarain people speak a dialect Izon. Their occupations, like other of Izon groups, include fishing, farming, canoe-carving and palm oil production.

Significant events
 11 April 2008: Youths from Gbaran clan in Yenagoa disrupted operations at the Etelebou flow station owned by the Shell Petroleum Development Company (SPDC). The action followed alleged non-implementation of a Global Memorandum of Understanding (GMOU) the company entered into with the host communities. The youths stormed the flow station and chased out the oil workers including the expatriate workers.

References

Ijaw
Bayelsa State